Marlin Thomas McKeever (January 1, 1940 – October 27, 2006) was an American football defensive end, fullback and punter at the University of Southern California (USC) and a tight end and linebacker during his 13-year National Football League (NFL) career. He was born in Cheyenne, Wyoming.

College career
McKeever earned two-time All-America honors during his years playing, 1958 to 1960. He was the Trojans' leading receiver in his junior and senior years.  His work at linebacker got the attention of professional football scouts.

Professional career
McKeever was a first round pick in the 1961 NFL Draft by the Los Angeles Rams, playing in the league from 1961 to 1973. He spent 1961–66 with the Rams, 1967 with the Minnesota Vikings, 1968–70 with the Washington Redskins, 1971–72 back with the Rams and finally 1973 with the Philadelphia Eagles before retiring. He was a one-time Pro Bowler, in 1966.  During his professional career, he was coached by five members of the Pro Football Hall of Fame: George Allen, Bud Grant, Otto Graham, Bob Waterfield and Vince Lombardi.

He was traded along with first- and third-round selections in 1971 (10th and 63rd overall–Isiah Robertson and Dave Elmendorf respectively) and third, fourth, fifth, sixth and seventh rounders in 1972 (73rd, 99th, 125th, 151st and 177th overall–to New England Patriots, traded to Philadelphia Eagles for Joe Carollo, Bob Christiansen, Texas Southern defensive tackle Eddie Herbert and to New York Giants respectively) from the Redskins to the Rams for Jack Pardee, Maxie Baughan, Myron Pottios, Diron Talbert, John Wilbur, Jeff Jordan and a 1971 fifth-round pick (124th overall–traded to Green Bay Packers for Boyd Dowler) on January 28, 1971.

California State Assembly race
In 1974, about a year after his NFL playing career ended, McKeever made a long shot bid for the California State Assembly as a Republican. Then incumbent John Quimby was defeated in the Democratic primary by Richard H. Robinson, who went on to beat McKeever by more than 21 points in what was then a Democratic-leaning Orange County district.

Personal life
Marlin and his brother Mike McKeever were the first twins to earn All-America status.  They grew up in Los Angeles. Both he and his brother appeared in the 1962 Three Stooges comedy film The Three Stooges Meet Hercules playing the Siamese Cyclops twins Ajax and Argo. Marlin appeared with several of his Los Angeles Rams teammates as football players in the 1965 Perry Mason episode, "The Case of the 12th Wildcat." Mike died in 1967, after a car accident that left him in a coma for 22 months.  On August 18, 1966, Marlin was a passenger in Roman Gabriel's car and lost a finger when Gabriel crashed into a parked car.

After the NFL, McKeever became a stockbroker and insurance executive. He also became the leader of the Trojan Football Alumni Club and close friend of recent USC coaches, including Pete Carroll.

On October 26, 2006, he fell at his home and slipped into a coma shortly thereafter. Doctors in the intensive care unit at St. Mary Medical Center in Long Beach, California reported a blood clot on his brain. He died from his injuries the next day. His interment was in Culver City's Holy Cross Cemetery.

References

External links
 

1940 births
2006 deaths
American football linebackers
American football tight ends
American stockbrokers
Los Angeles Rams players
Minnesota Vikings players
Philadelphia Eagles players
USC Trojans football players
Washington Redskins players
Western Conference Pro Bowl players
Sportspeople from Cheyenne, Wyoming
Players of American football from Los Angeles